Chammanthi Podi is a dry condiment and chutney from the South Indian state of Kerala. Usually, regular coconut chutneys would spoil the same day without refrigeration, so making Chammanthi Podi was a way to preserve the chutney for months. 

To make chammanthi podi, shredded coconut and spices are dry-roasted in a pan to evaporate the moisture from the mixture. Then the mixture is ground up and stored to be used later.  The word chammanthi means chutney or sauce, and the word podi means powder (in Malayalam).

See also
 List of chutneys
 List of Indian condiments

References

Indian condiments
Chutney
Kerala cuisine